Lars Patrik Viktor Bergner (born 12 June 1962 in Stockholm, Sweden) is a Swedish actor, film director and playwright.

Selected filmography
1987 - Nionde kompaniet
1994 - Illusioner
1994 - Den vite riddaren (TV)
1997 - Kalle Blomkvist och Rasmus
1998 - Rederiet (TV)

External links

Swedish male actors
20th-century Swedish dramatists and playwrights
Living people
Swedish film directors
1962 births
Swedish male dramatists and playwrights